Ford Escort may refer to one of several vehicles manufactured by Ford Motor Company:
 Ford Escort (North America), a compact car manufactured for the North American market from 1980 to 2003
 Ford Escort (Europe), a vehicle manufactured by Ford Europe from 1968 to 2002
 Ford Escort RS Cosworth, sports and rally version of the fifth generation European Escort
 Ford Escort (China), a Ford Focus-based compact car for the Chinese market since 2015
 Ford Escort (Squire-based estate), a variant of the Ford Squire built and marketed in the United Kingdom from 1955 to 1961